Lachesilla tectorum is a species of Psocoptera from the Lachesillidae family that is endemic to the Canary Islands.

References

Lachesillidae
Insects described in 1931
Endemic fauna of the Canary Islands
Insects of the Canary Islands